Chaldybar is a village in Jalal-Abad Region, in Kyrgyzstan. Its population was 1,082 in 2021.

References

External links
Satellite map at Maplandia.com

Populated places in Jalal-Abad Region